Hockenden is a rural hamlet of South East London, within the London Borough of Bromley. It is located on the border of Greater London with Kent, north west of Swanley.

Transport
There are no bus routes that serve Hockenden; the closet link is the 233 route run by Transport for London which goes from Swanley to Eltham via Sidcup.

The closest National Rail station is Swanley.

References

Villages in London
Districts of the London Borough of Bromley
Villages in the London Borough of Bromley